Shicheng is an ancient underwater city situated under Qiandao Lake in Chun'an County, Hangzhou, Zhejiang Province, China, and was the previous county of the defunct Sui'an County. The city was flooded for the purpose of industrialization by the Chinese government in the year 1959 after a hydroelectric dam was required for the province of Zhejiang. According to the evidence found, the lost city was inhabited for centuries, but is now primarily used as an underwater tourist attraction by tourists and diving experts.

Shicheng was named the 'Lion City' after the nearby Wu Shi Mountain (Five Lion Mountain) in the Qiandao Lake.

Origins and discovery 
Shicheng was purposely flooded to create space for a hydroelectric dam on government orders. Approximately 300,000 people were relocated as a result of the project. The former residents were connected with the Lion City by basis of ancestry and culture. Shī Chéng was believed to be the most prominent Chinese city that remains well-preserved. Many of its homes, temples structures and paved roads were preserved by being 131 feet underwater. In this way, it was protected from wind, rain and sun damage. The city has five entrance gates, which is different than the traditional four. The stone architecture dates to the Ming and Qing dynasties. Shī Chéng's streets contain 265 archways with surviving stonework that date to 1777, and the city walls date to the 16th century.

The Chinese government planned an expedition to explore the remains of the lost metropolis in 2001, when the city was rediscovered. In 2011, pictures and graphics were published by the Chinese National Geography, which sparked interest among the general public and researchers to explore.

Tourism 
Diving to Shicheng has been limited to divers with experience with diving during night and in deep water.

References 

Submerged places
Underwater ruins
Ancient Chinese cities
Chun'an County
History of Hangzhou